Lee Jeong-jae (born June 13, 1996 in Seoul) is a South Korean male curler from Gyeonggi Province

Teams

Personal life
He is married and has one daughter.

References

External links

Video: 

Living people
1996 births
Curlers from Seoul
Sportspeople from Gyeonggi Province
South Korean male curlers

Competitors at the 2019 Winter Universiade
21st-century South Korean people